Alaric Jackson (born July 14, 1998) is a Canadian-born American football offensive tackle for the Los Angeles Rams of the National Football League (NFL). He played college football at Iowa.

Early life and high school
Jackson was born and grew up in Windsor, Ontario before moving to Detroit, Michigan. He attended Renaissance High School, where he originally played basketball and did not start playing football until his junior year. Jackson committed to play college football at Iowa over offers from Iowa State, Nebraska, and Michigan State.

College career
Jackson redshirted his true freshman season. He started every regular season game for Iowa at left tackle during his redshirt freshman season and was named to the Big Ten Conference All-Freshman team and a freshman All-American by the Football Writers Association of America. Jackson missed the season opener of his sophomore season after being suspended for violating team rules, but started the final 12 games of the season and was named second-team All-Big Ten. He missed three games due to injury as a redshirt junior and was named third-team All-Big Ten at the end of the season. As a redshirt senior, Jackson was named first-team All-Big Ten and a second-team All-American by the AFCA after starting all eight of Iowa's games in the team's COVID-19-shortened 2020 season.

Professional career

Jackson signed with the Los Angeles Rams as an undrafted free agent on May 3, 2021. He made the Rams' 53-man roster out of training camp. Jackson made his NFL debut on October 31, 2021, playing nine snaps on offense in the fourth quarter of a 38-22 win over the Houston Texans. Jackson won Super Bowl LVI when the Rams defeated the Cincinnati Bengals 23-20.

Jackson entered the 2022 season as a backup offensive lineman. He was named the starting right guard in Week 3 for four games, then moved to left tackle for two games due to injuries. He was diagnosed with blood clots and was placed on season-ending injured reserve on November 16, 2022.

References

External links
Iowa Hawkeyes bio
Los Angeles Rams bio

1998 births
Living people
Players of American football from Michigan
American football offensive tackles
Iowa Hawkeyes football players
Los Angeles Rams players
Canadian players of American football
Sportspeople from Detroit
Sportspeople from Windsor, Ontario
Gridiron football people from Ontario